A laboratory technician is a person who works in a laboratory performing analytical or experimental procedures, maintaining laboratory equipment.

According to the Oxford English Dictionary, the first use of the term laboratory technician was in 1896:It [sc. a therapeutic property] is now totally abandoned by the advanced laboratory technicians.The term is now widely accepted. Laboratory technicians are found in a wide range of scientific fields, including forensic science, pathology, chemistry, biomedical science and physics. Laboratory technicians may hold a range of formal academic qualifications, such as associate degrees, often obtained through vocational education. They are usually supervised by laboratory managers.

References
 
 
1890s neologisms
Science occupations